Crescent City may refer to:

Geography
Crescent City, California
Crescent City, Florida
Crescent City, Illinois
Crescent Mills, California, formerly named Crescent City
"The Crescent City", popular nickname for New Orleans, Louisiana

Music
 "Crescent City", a song about New Orleans by Lucinda Williams from her 1988 self-titled album
 Crescent City Radio, an Internet radio station based in New Orleans, Louisiana
 Crescent City, a hyper-opera by composer Anne LeBaron, premiered in Los Angeles 2012

Other uses
 Crescent City (schooner), two ships that served Crescent City, California
 "Crescent City" (NCIS), a 2014 two-part episode of NCIS, that served as the backdoor pilot for NCIS: New Orleans
 Crescent City, an adult fantasy series by Sarah J. Maas